The Granite Cutters' International Association of America was a trade union representing granite cutters in the United States and Canada.

History
The union was founded in March 1877 near Rockland, Maine, USA. Its official publication was the Granite Cutters’ Journal. It was among the founding organizations of the American Federation of Labor.

It was founded as the Granite Cutters' National Union and later Granite Cutters' International Union of the United States and the British Provinces of America before taking its final name in 1905. Jobs for skilled granite cutters dwindled in the 1960s and the union eventually merged into the Tile, Marble, Terrazzo, Finishers', Shopworkers' and Granite Cutters' International Union.

Leaders
The leader of the union was initially the secretary; from 1905 the secretary-treasurer; and from 1912, the president.

1877: Thompson H. Murch
1878: Josiah B. Dyer
1895: James Duncan
1923: Samuel Squibb
1935: Lawrence Foley
1951: Costanzo Pagnano
1967: Joseph P. Ricciarelli

Further reading
 Grindle, Roger L. Tombstones and Paving Blocks: The History of the Maine Granite Industry. Courier-Gazette, Rockland, Me, 1977.

References

American Federation of Labor
Stonemasons' trade unions
Trade unions established in 1877
1877 in Maine
Rockland, Maine
Trade unions in Maine
Trade unions in Massachusetts
1877 establishments in Maine
Defunct trade unions in the United States